Tong Fong is a small village in Ta Kwu Ling, North District, Hong Kong.

Administration
Tong Fong is a recognized village under the New Territories Small House Policy.

History
The village of Man Uk Pin in North District was first settled in the late 17th century by the Man who came from Wuhua in Guangdong province. The Man later moved out of the village and stayed in Heung Yuen, Ping Che and Tong Fong nearby.

Features
The Wing Kit Study Hall in Tong Fong has been listed as a Grade III historic building.

References

External links

 Delineation of area of existing village Tong Fong (Ta Kwu Ling) for election of resident representative (2019 to 2022)
 Pictures of Wing Kit Study Hall, Nos. 12-13 Tong Fong
 Antiquities Advisory Board. Historic Building Appraisal: Fuk Sin Tai, Nos. 8-9 Tong Fong Pictures

Villages in North District, Hong Kong